Jamie Bryant (born October 1, 1969) is an American football coach.  He was the Special Team Coordinator  at Colorado State University.  He previously served the Defensive Coordinator  at Delaware State University and as defensive coordinator for the University of Houston. After coaching a defense that ranked near the bottom in scoring and yards allowed, head coach Tony Levine decided to part ways with his assistant. As linebackers coach for the 2011 season, Bryant was promoted to defensive coordinator under head coach Levine as of 2012.

References

External links
 Delaware State profile
 Youngstown State profile

1969 births
Living people
Clarion Golden Eagles football coaches
Delaware State Hornets football coaches
Houston Cougars football coaches
North Carolina Tar Heels football coaches
Ohio Wesleyan Battling Bishops football players
Saint Francis Red Flash football coaches
Vanderbilt Commodores football coaches
Youngstown State Penguins football coaches
High school football coaches in Ohio